The 1993 season was São Paulo's 64th season since club's existence.

Statistics

Scorers

Managers performance

Overall

{|class="wikitable"
|-
|Games played || 98 (36 Campeonato Paulista, 6 Copa do Brasil, 8 Copa Libertadores, 2 Copa de Oro, 20 Campeonato Brasileiro, 2 Recopa Sudamericana, 8 Supercopa Sudamericana, 1 Intercontinental Cup, 15 Friendly match)
|-
|Games won || 46 (20 Campeonato Paulista, 2 Copa do Brasil, 4 Copa Libertadores, 0 Copa de Oro, 9 Campeonato Brasileiro, 0 Recopa Sudamericana, 2 Supercopa Sudamericana, 1 Intercontinental Cup, 8 Friendly match)
|-
|Games drawn || 30 (7 Campeonato Paulista, 2 Copa do Brasil, 2 Copa Libertadores, 1 Copa de Oro, 8 Campeonato Brasileiro, 2 Recopa Sudamericana, 5 Supercopa Sudamericana, 0 Intercontinental Cup, 3 Friendly match)
|-
|Games lost || 22 (9 Campeonato Paulista, 2 Copa do Brasil, 2 Copa Libertadores, 1 Copa de Oro, 3 Campeonato Brasileiro, 0 Recopa Sudamericana, 1 Supercopa Sudamericana, 0 Intercontinental Cup, 4 Friendly match)
|-
|Goals scored || 163
|-
|Goals conceded || 95
|-
|Goal difference || +68
|-
|Best result || 6–1 (H) v Noroeste – Campeonato Paulista – 1993.03.046–1 (H) v Santos – Campeonato Paulista – 1993.06.03
|-
|Worst result || 1–3 (A) v Albacete – Friendly match – 1993.08.18
|-
|Top scorer || Palhinha and Raí (22)
|-

Friendlies

Torneo Ciudad de Santiago

Troféo Santiago de Compostela

Los Angeles City Tournament

Torneo Jalisco

Troféo Teresa Herrera

Troféo Ciudad de Albacete

Troféo Colombino

Troféo Ramón de Carranza

Official competitions

Campeonato Paulista

League table

Matches

Second stage

Matches

Record

Copa do Brasil

Round of 32

Eightfinals

Quarterfinals

Record

Copa Libertadores

Eightfinals

Quarterfinals

Semifinals

Finals

Record

Copa de Oro

Record

Campeonato Brasileiro

League table

Matches

Second stage

Matches

 # Match valid simultaneously for the Campeonato Brasileiro and Recopa Sudamericana.

Record

Recopa Sudamericana

 # Match valid simultaneously for the Recopa Sudamericana and Campeonato Brasileiro.

Record

Supercopa Sudamericana

Eightfinals

Quarterfinals

Semifinals

Finals

Record

Intercontinental Cup

Record

External links
official website 

Sao Paulo
1993